Hopewell School may refer to:

United States
 Hopewell District No. 45 School, Hopewell, Arkansas
 Hopewell School, Glastonbury, Connecticut
 The Hopewell School, a former high school in Dubach, Louisiana
 Hopewell School (Taunton, Massachusetts)
 Several schools in Hopewell, Covington County, Mississippi
 New Hopewell School (1885–1950)
 Hopewell Colored Separate School District (opened in 1922)
 Hopewell Elementary School, a former Rosenwald School (opened in the 1920s)
 Hopewell School, Neshoba County School District, Mississippi
 Hopewell Junior High School and Hopewell Elementary School, Hopewell Area School District, Aliquippa, Pennsylvania
 Hopewell Rosenwald School, Clarks Hill, South Carolina
 Hopewell School (Cedar Creek, Texas)
 Hopewell School (historical), a placename in Hampshire County, West Virginia

Other places
 Hopewell Avenue Public School in Ottawa, Ontario, Canada
 Hopewell School, a school in the London Borough of Barking and Dagenham, England

See also
 Hopewell High School (disambiguation)